The Unexamined Life is the debut studio album by the band Supreme Dicks, released in 1993 through Homestead Records.

Track listing

Personnel 
Supreme Dicks
Mark Hanson – bass guitar, drums, vocals
Daniel Oxenberg – guitar, vocals
Steven Shavel – slide guitar, vocals
Jon Shere – guitar, vocals
Jim Spring – guitar
Production and additional personnel
Lou Barlow – bass guitar on "Strange Song"
Benjie Bernhardt – violin on "Ten Past Eleven"
Rich Hinklin – engineering, 
Paul MacNamara – engineering
Mark Merrigan – engineering, drums
Pete Morgan – vocals on "Ten Past Eleven"
Paul Roche – engineering
Azalia Snail – photography

References

External links 
 

1993 albums
Homestead Records albums
Supreme Dicks albums